Hendrie Dudley Oakshott, Baron Oakshott (8 November 1904 – 1 February 1975), known as Sir Hendrie Oakshott, 1st Baronet, from 1959 to 1964, was a British Conservative Party politician.

At the 1950 general election, he was elected as Member of Parliament (MP) for the Bebington constituency in The Wirral Peninsula, on Merseyside.  He held his seat through three further general elections, before retiring from the House of Commons at the 1964 general election.  He was then succeeded as MP by the future Chancellor and Foreign Secretary, Geoffrey Howe.

He was created a Baronet, of Bebington in the County Palatine of Chester, on 10 July 1959 and was further honoured when he was created a life peer as Baron Oakshott, of Bebington in the County Palatine of Chester on 21 August 1964. Lord Oakshott died in February 1975, aged 70. He was succeeded in the baronetcy by his eldest son Anthony.

References

External links 
 

|-

1904 births
1975 deaths
Conservative Party (UK) MPs for English constituencies
Conservative Party (UK) life peers
Oakshott, Sir Hendrie, 1st Baronet
Treasurers of the Household
UK MPs 1950–1951
UK MPs 1951–1955
UK MPs 1955–1959
UK MPs 1959–1964
UK MPs who were granted peerages
Ministers in the third Churchill government, 1951–1955
Ministers in the Eden government, 1955–1957
Ministers in the Macmillan and Douglas-Home governments, 1957–1964
Life peers created by Elizabeth II